Michel Humberto López Elenes (born September 29, 1993, in Mexicali) is a Mexican professional footballer who currently plays for Murciélagos F.C. He notably scored seven goals in a match with Diablos Azules de Guasave in the Liga TDP in 2011; they defeated Guerreros Pericués 16–2. He made his professional debut with Murciélagos during a Copa MX defeat to Deportivo Tepic on 8 March 2016.

References

External links
 

1993 births
Living people
Mexican footballers
Association football forwards
Diablos Azules de Guasave footballers
Murciélagos FC footballers
Ascenso MX players
Liga Premier de México players
Tercera División de México players
Footballers from Baja California
People from Mexicali